The Technical Institute Paolini Cassiano, often referred to simply as il Paolini, is an Italian secondary school offering diplomas in administration, finance, marketing, accounting, computer programming, and international relations

See also
 Education in Italy

Notes

External links
http://www.paolinicassiano.gov.it/  - Official school website

Secondary schools in Italy
Schools in Emilia-Romagna
Imola